Boucks Island is an island in Schoharie County, New York. It is located south of Fultonham, on the Schoharie Creek.

See also

 Bouck's Island – A hishoric farm.

References

River islands of New York (state)
Landforms of Schoharie County, New York